

H03A Thyroid preparations

H03AA Thyroid hormones
H03AA01 Levothyroxine sodium
H03AA02 Liothyronine sodium
H03AA03 Combinations of levothyroxine and liothyronine
H03AA04 Tiratricol
H03AA05 Thyroid gland preparations
H03AA51 Levothyroxine sodium and iodine compounds

H03B Antithyroid preparations

H03BA Thiouracils
H03BA01 Methylthiouracil
H03BA02 Propylthiouracil
H03BA03 Benzylthiouracil

H03BB Sulphur-containing imidazole derivatives
H03BB01 Carbimazole
H03BB02 Thiamazole
H03BB52 Thiamazole, combinations

H03BC Perchlorates
H03BC01 Potassium perchlorate

H03BX Other antithyroid preparations
H03BX01 Diiodotyrosine
H03BX02 Dibromotyrosine

H03C Iodine therapy

H03CA Iodine therapy

References

H03